Prunus bucharica is a species of wild almond native to Tajikistan, Uzbekistan and Afghanistan, preferring to grow at 1000-1800m above sea level. Long thought to be one of the wild species that contributed to the origin of the cultivated almond (Prunus dulcis), genetic testing of both nuclear and chloroplast DNA has shown that to be untrue; the closest relative (and presumed lone ancestor) of Prunus dulcis is Prunus fenzliana.

Description
Prunus bucharica is a tall shrub or small tree between 1.5 and 7m tall. Prunus bucharica differs from all other almonds in having broadly ovate leaves and a completely smooth endocarp.

References

bucharica
Flora of Tajikistan
Flora of Uzbekistan
Flora of Afghanistan
Plants described in 1913